Miss Faroe Islands is a national beauty pageant in the Faroe Islands.

History
The pageant was held for the first time in 2017. Miss Earth Denmark 2015 Turið Elinborgardóttir is a consultant for the pageant.

Titleholders

Faroe Islands at International pageants

Miss Universe Faroe Islands

References

External links

Beauty pageants in the Faroe Islands
Faroe Islands
Recurring events established in 2017
2017 establishments in the Faroe Islands